Satyam Audios is an Indian music company headquartered at Kochi, Kerala. The greatest stage is not the one where we perform, rather it is for those who create, shape, and mold to form a piece of music. Satyam audios are one of the leading music company in Kerala, Ernakulam. They have covered a larger portion of the music labels of Kerala. These label has produced and distributed film soundtracks, poems, music albums, LP record etc. They were widely accepted to be the best music running companies in the south. They have established themselves in the 1990s. Their scope of responsibility was not one or two songs or an artist’s entire album. It ranged from having released nearly 675 film music titles with 3109 songs & 209 nonfilm titles 1885 songs, totaling nearly 5000 songs including the recent super hit “Jimmiki kammal” and the latest songs of Mohanlal’s super hit film “Odiyan”.

They work with and coach musicians and result in the creation and publication of quality musical work. A major aspect of this giant company is their creation in quality sounds that match both the musicians’ and producers’ plans. This is because the music itself is a universal language of mankind.

They may gather musical ideas for the project, collaborate with the artists to select cover tunes or original songs by the artist/group, work with artists and help them to improve their songs, lyrics or arrangements. This typically develops an overall vision for the album and how the various songs may interrelate. This definitely has to do well, as it is an art of thinking with sound and the sound in the movement of time.

They have brought in an announcement that as a music label industry they must include their production house “Satyam Cinemas” with some great projects for the growth of their empire. Satyam cinemas function as a hybrid between a creative agency and an audiovisual production company, with a concentrated focus on the end result.

Highlighting the fact that story & screenplay are the real stars of every movie, the awaited project which has been worked on by many are ready to be put forth. The projects, Satyam Cinema have planned new films with some good talented directors and artists for us. So let us anxiously wait to unveil this eye-opening project, of those who have given their time, patience, mind and soul to carve out a new outlook to the existing frame. It’s all about the light, and they will capture something which has never been so appealing.

References

External links

Official website

Indian record labels
Record label distributors
Indian music record labels
Companies based in Kochi
1990s establishments in Kerala
Record labels established in the 1990s